Devyani Sharma  is a sociolinguistics professor and chair of the Linguistics department at Queen Mary University of London.

Education
Sharma holds a PhD and MA in linguistics from Stanford University and a BA in anthropology/ linguistics and fine art from Dartmouth College.

Research
Her research interests include language variation and change, syntactic variation and style. Sharma's work particularly focusses on these topics within World Englishes and British Asian communities. She has written widely on these topics for various publications and has recently served as an associate editor for the Journal of Sociolinguistics.

In recent years Sharma has completed an Economic and Social Research Council funded project on 'Dialect Style and Development in a Diasporic Community' with Ben Rampton and Roxy Harris, both at King's College London.

Sharma has published extensively on British Asian English in addition to a widely used volume on Research Methods with Rob Podesva.

Personal life
Sharma is the daughter of former Commonwealth Secretary-General Kamalesh Sharma.

Works
(ed. with Hundt) 'English in the Indian Diaspora'. Amsterdam: Benjamins. 2014.
(ed. with Podesva) 'Research Methods in Linguistics'. Cambridge: Cambridge University Press. 2013. 
(ed. with Benor, Rose, Sweetland & Zhang) 'Gendered Practices in Language'. Stanford: CSLI. 2002.

References

External links
Web site

Academics of Queen Mary University of London
Linguists from the United Kingdom
Women linguists
Sociolinguists
Living people
Year of birth missing (living people)